National Defence Council is a governmental body in charge of coordinating Yemen's national security and defense strategy. It was formed by President Ali Abdullah Saleh on 20 August 1991. The council is chaired by the President of Yemen and composed of several key ministers and military officials.

History 
The National Defence Council was established by Decree no. (62) of 1991.

Responsibilities 
The National Defence Council is responsible for drawing up defense strategy, advising on issues related to declaring the war, mobilization, and state of emergency. On 22 October 2022, the council held a meeting in Aden to discuss attacks claimed by the Houthis movement on al-Dhabba and Nashimah oil ports in Hadramaut and Shabwah governorates. The council took a decision no. (1) to label the Houthi group a terrorist organization.

Membership

References 

1991 establishments in Yemen
Government of Yemen
National security councils